The James Rowley and Mary J. Blackaby House is a historic residence located in Ontario, Oregon, United States.

The house was listed on the National Register of Historic Places in 2001.

See also
National Register of Historic Places listings in Malheur County, Oregon

References

External links

Houses completed in 1908
Houses in Malheur County, Oregon
Houses on the National Register of Historic Places in Oregon
National Register of Historic Places in Malheur County, Oregon
Ontario, Oregon
Queen Anne architecture in Oregon
1908 establishments in Oregon